Zierer, Ziehrer are German language surnames:

 Benno Zierer (born 1934), German politician, MdB
 Maria Zierer-Steinmüller (1895–1979)
 Otto Zierer (1909–1983), German writer

Ziehrer 

Ziehrer:
 Karl (Carl) Michael Ziehrer (1843–1922), an Austrian composer
 List of dances and marches by Karl Michael Ziehrer
 List of operettas by Karl Michael Ziehrer

See also 
 Zierer

German-language surnames